East Sussex County Council in England is elected every four years.

Political control

Leadership
The leaders of the council since 1999 have been:

Council elections
1973 East Sussex County Council election
1977 East Sussex County Council election
1981 East Sussex County Council election
1985 East Sussex County Council election
1989 East Sussex County Council election
1993 East Sussex County Council election
1997 East Sussex County Council election
2001 East Sussex County Council election
2005 East Sussex County Council election (boundary changes increased the number of seats by 5)
2009 East Sussex County Council election
2013 East Sussex County Council election
2017 East Sussex County Council election
2021 East Sussex County Council election

County result maps

By-election results

1989-1993

1993-1997

1997-2001

2001-2005

2005-2009

References

 East Sussex election results
 By-election results

External links
East Sussex County Council

 
Council elections in East Sussex
County council elections in England